is a Japanese former professional baseball pitcher in Japan's Nippon Professional Baseball. He played for the Tohoku Rakuten Golden Eagles in 2015 and 2016.

External links

NPB stats

1994 births
Living people
People from Yame, Fukuoka
Baseball people from Fukuoka Prefecture
Japanese baseball players
Nippon Professional Baseball pitchers
Tohoku Rakuten Golden Eagles players